Kothaimangalam Wetlands are located near to Palani, Tamil Nadu, India. The huge lakes are the habitat for lot of Migratory birds. One of the wetland is adjacent to the Shanmuganadhi river.

Some of the birds which can be seen here are painted stork, Oriental ibis, common sandpiper, Indian spot-billed duck, common coot, rosy starling, little cormorant, cattle egret, intermediate egret, little egret, southern coucal, rose-ringed parakeet, white-breasted kingfisher, pied kingfisher, darter, little grebe, spotted owlet, Indian roller, ashy prinia, common hoopoe, common moorhen, common myna, pied wagtail, grey wagtail, Asian green bee-eater, brahminy kite, black kite, black-winged kite, Asian koel, pond heron, black drongo, pied cuckoo, blue-faced malkoha, Indian robin, purple sunbird, purple-rumped sunbird, white-headed babbler, common flameback, open-bill stork, greater egret, grey heron, Eurasian collared dove, glossy ibis, rock pigeon, white-breasted waterhen, woolly-necked stork, lesser whistling duck.

Landforms of Tamil Nadu
Wetlands of India
Dindigul district